Prevention Police of NAJA is an Iranian law enforcement agency responsible for crime prevention.

References 

Law Enforcement Command of Islamic Republic of Iran
Crime prevention